Andrea Bosic (15 August 1919 – 8 January 2012) was an Italian film actor of Slovene origin. He appeared in more than 50 films between 1951 and 1985, mainly in films called Spaghetti Westerns. He has appeared in films alongside John Phillip Law, Giuliano Gemma, Lee Van Cleef and Ivan Rassimov. He was born as Ignazio Andrej Božič in Gomilško, now a suburb of Maribor, Slovenia.

Partial filmography

 Appointment for Murder (1951) - Aldo Manni
 Two Nights with Cleopatra (1954) - Caio Malpurnio (uncredited)
 Ulysses (1954) - Agamemnon (uncredited)
 La cambiale (1959) - Prince Vasilij
 The Prisoner of the Iron Mask (1961)
 Sword of the Conqueror  (1961) - King Cunimond
 Rômulo e Remo (1961) - Faustolo
 The Witch's Curse (1962) - Judge Parris
 Damon and Pythias (1962) - Arcanos
 Il sangue e la sfida (1962)
 Imperial Venus (1962) - Del Val
 The Verona Trial (1963) - Tullio Cianetti
 The Magnificent Adventurer (1963) - Michelangelo
 Sandokan the Great (1963) - Yanez
 The Avenger of Venice (1964)
 Temple of the White Elephant (1964) - Colonel
 Romeo and Juliet (1964) - Capulet
 Pirates of Malaysia (1964) - Yanez
 Genoveffa di Brabante (1964) - Duque di Brabante
 Adventures of the Bengal Lancers (1964) - Col. Lee McDonald
 Due mafiosi contro Goldginger  (1965) - Col. Herrman
 Spies Strike Silently (1966) - Rashid
 El Greco (1966) - Prosecutor
 Arizona Colt (1966) - Pedro / Pete
 For a Few Extra Dollars (1966) - Colonel as Davis camp
 Kill or Be Killed (1966) - Lo sceriffo
 Kriminal (1966) - Ispettore Milton
 Master Stroke (1967) - Mr. Van Doren
 Argoman the Fantastic Superman (1967) - Admiral Durand
 Killer Caliber .32  (1967) - Averell
 I giorni della violenza (1967) - Mr. Evans
 Death Rides Along (1967) - Bryan Talbot
 15 forche per un assassino (1967) - Andrew Ferguson, the Pastor
 Day of Anger (1967) - Abel Murray
 Two Faces of the Dollar (1967) - Col. Talbert
 Your Turn to Die (1967) - Diplomat
 Danger: Diabolik (1968) - Bank Manager
 Gunman Sent by God (1968) - Jonathan Murphy
 I Want Him Dead (1968) - Mallek
 Il marchio di Kriminal (1968) - Inspector Patrick Milton
 Rebu (1969) - Manager of Beirut Casino
 Death Knows No Time (1969)
 A Bullet for Rommel (1969) - Captain Agamemnon Geeves
 Hornets' Nest (1970) - Gen. Von Kleber
 The Tigers of Mompracem (1970) - Yanez
 They Call Me Hallelujah (1971) - Johannes Krantz
 Siamo tutti in libertà provvisoria (1971)
 Goodnight, Ladies and Gentlemen (1976) - Bishop of Naples (uncredited)
 The Greatest Battle (1978) - Mimmo Parnat
 Manhattan Baby (1982) - Optician
 Formula for a Murder (1985) - Father Peter

References

External links

1919 births
2012 deaths
Italian male film actors
People from the City Municipality of Maribor
Slovenian emigrants to Italy